Harvard Sitkoff (born 1941
) is an American historian.

Life 

He lives in Durham, New Hampshire.

Career 

He is a professor emeritus of history at the University of New Hampshire. He contributed to the 1974 Encyclopedia of American Biography, most notably with an entry on Muhammed Ali, and has also written on the politics of Martin Luther King Jr. Describing that period, Sitkoff has called the summer of 1967 "most intense and destructive wave of racial violence the nation had ever witnessed.."

Partial Bibliography
 The Struggle for Black Equality: 1954-1992 
 King: Pilgrimage to the Mountaintop 
 A New Deal for Blacks: The Emergence of Civil Rights as a National Issue: The Depression Decade 
 The Struggle for Black Equality 
 Perspectives on Modern America: Making Sense of the Twentieth Century  
 Fifty Years Later: New Deal Evaluated 
 Toward Freedom Land: The Long Struggle for Racial Equality in America

References

External links
 

1945 births
Living people
21st-century American historians
21st-century American male writers
American male non-fiction writers